Rein Tölp (11 October 1941 – 16 April 2018) was an Estonian middle-distance runner. He competed in the men's 800 metres at the 1964 Summer Olympics, representing the Soviet Union.

References

1941 births
2018 deaths
Athletes (track and field) at the 1964 Summer Olympics
Estonian male middle-distance runners
Soviet male middle-distance runners
Olympic athletes of the Soviet Union
Athletes from Tallinn